Tomasz Sikora (born 21 December 1973) is a former Polish biathlete.

Life and career
Sikora was born in Wodzisław Śląski. In 1993, he finished second in 10 km sprint at the Junior World Championships in Ruhpolding.
He was world champion in 1995 (20 km), runner-up in the world championships in 2004 (also 20 km) and bronze medalist in 1997 (team competition). On 25 February 2006 he was placed second in the 15 km mass start at the 2006 Winter Olympics in Turin, winning the second and final medal for Poland in those Olympics.

On 23 March 2006 Sikora won the IBU World Cup sprint title, beating Ole Einar Bjørndalen by 5 points.  On January 10, 2009, he took the lead in the overall world cup classification, which he lost 42 days later. At last he was 2nd in overall IBU World Cup 2009 and 2nd in IBU World Cup 2009 sprint.  He was chosen the best biathlete 2009, in voting of national team coaches. In 2010 he won the fans' award.

Sikora retired after the 2011–12 season.

Biathlon results
All results are sourced from the International Biathlon Union.

Olympic Games
1 medal (1 silver)

*Pursuit was added as an event in 2002, with mass start being added in 2006.

World Championships
3 medals (1 gold, 1 silver, 1 bronze)

*During Olympic seasons competitions are only held for those events not included in the Olympic program.
**Team was removed as an event in 1998, and pursuit was added in 1997 with mass start being added in 1999 and the mixed relay in 2005.

Individual victories
5 victories (1 In, 1 Sp, 1 Pu, 2 MS)

*Results are from UIPMB and IBU races which include the Biathlon World Cup, Biathlon World Championships and the Winter Olympic Games.

See also
List of athletes with the most appearances at Olympic Games

References

External links
 
Official website 

1973 births
Living people
People from Wodzisław Śląski
Sportspeople from Silesian Voivodeship
Polish male biathletes
Biathletes at the 1994 Winter Olympics
Biathletes at the 1998 Winter Olympics
Biathletes at the 2002 Winter Olympics
Biathletes at the 2006 Winter Olympics
Biathletes at the 2010 Winter Olympics
Olympic biathletes of Poland
Medalists at the 2006 Winter Olympics
Olympic medalists in biathlon
Olympic silver medalists for Poland
Biathlon World Championships medalists
Universiade medalists in biathlon
Universiade gold medalists for Poland
Universiade silver medalists for Poland
Competitors at the 1999 Winter Universiade
Competitors at the 2001 Winter Universiade